12-inch mortar may refer to:

 12-inch coast defense mortar, a mortar used by the Coast Artillery Corps of the United States Army 1885–1945.
 Mortier de 12 Gribeauval, a mortar used by the French Army from 1780 to the mid-19th century.